Josep Gombau Balague (born 5 June 1976) is a Spanish professional football manager who was most recently the head coach of Indian Super League club Odisha.

He is a former Barcelona youth team coach and has held multiple positions at the club's youth academy.

Career
Born in Amposta, Tarragona, Catalonia, Gombau was a goalkeeper, but switched to coaching at the age of 16. After coaching youth teams in CF Amposta and RCD Espanyol, he was signed by FC Barcelona in 2003 as a youth academy coach. 
 In 2008, he became the technical director of FCB Escola, a Barcelona youth football academy opened at the Raffles International School in Jumeirah, Dubai.

Kitchee
Gombau moved to Hong Kong to join Kitchee as the club's head coach in 2009. Under Gombau, Kitchee won two league titles, two FA Cups, and one League Cup. Before the 2012 AFC Cup away match to Tampines Rovers, Kitchee captain Chu Siu Kei applauded the contribution of Gombau to the team, saying: "The coach understands that the players might be smaller than those in the other teams, but using the ball more on the ground gives us an advantage over our opponents. We have more control of the game now".

Adelaide United
On 30 April 2013, it was announced that Gombau would leave Kitchee to coach Adelaide United in the A-League. He signed a two-season deal, arriving at the club in July 2013. His first two signings were compatriots and Barcelona youth products Sergio Cirio and Isaías Sánchez. Gombau also brought his long-time assistant coach Pau Marti to work alongside existing assistant coach Michael Valkanis. Gombau stated that he wants to implement a possession-based football style at Adelaide. Gombau actively exercised his ambition to develop South Australian grassroots football by hosting free seminars for local coaches. Gombau's United won the inaugural FFA Cup by defeating Perth Glory 1–0. Gombau left the club in July 2015 to take up a youth coaching role in the United States.

Australia U-23
Known as a developer of talent, on 28 June 2016, Gombau was appointed as head coach of Australia U-23 in place of Aurelio Vidmar, under whom the team failed to qualify for the Olympics.

Western Sydney Wanderers
On 1 November 2017, Gombau was assigned as head coach of Western Sydney Wanderers following the departure of Tony Popovic at the beginning of the season and Hayden Foxe acting as interim coach in the first four rounds. After just six months in charge, 19 April 2018, the club announced they had terminated Gombau's contract after failing to qualify for the 2017/18 A-League Finals Series.

Delhi Dynamos / Odisha FC
On 2 August 2018, Gombau was appointed as head coach of the Indian Super League club Delhi Dynamos following the departure of Miguel Ángel Portugal. Under Gombau, the team did not qualify for the playoffs and placed eighth on the points table, but the team's performance improved. Ahead of the 2019–20 Indian Super League season, the club changed its base from Delhi to Odisha and rebranded as Odisha FC. He extended his contract with the club and they finished sixth in the 2019–20 season table, closely missing the playoffs spot. On 18 March 2020, Gombau and the club amicably parted ways due to personal reasons.

On 6 May 2021, he was announced as a member of the club's technical committee along with David Villa and Victor Oñate.

Queensboro FC
In July 2020, Gombau was announced as the first-ever head coach and sporting director for David Villa's USL Championship club Queensboro FC. He left his positions at the club in June 2022, before their scheduled USL Championship debut in 2023.

Return to Odisha
On 8 June 2022, Gombau rejoined Odisha FC as the head coach on a two-year deal.

Personal life
Gombau and his wife Romina have two daughters, Bruna and Maria.

Managerial statistics

Honours
Kitchee SC
 Hong Kong First Division League: 2010–11, 2011–12
 Hong Kong FA Cup: 2011–12, 2012–13
 Hong Kong League Cup: 2011–12

Adelaide United
 FFA Cup: 2014

Individual
 Hong Kong First Division League Best coach: 2010–11, 2011–12

References

External links

1976 births
Kitchee SC
Living people
Spanish football managers
A-League Men managers
Kitchee SC managers
Adelaide United FC managers
Western Sydney Wanderers FC managers
FC Barcelona non-playing staff
People from Montsià
Sportspeople from the Province of Tarragona
Spanish expatriate sportspeople in Hong Kong
Spanish expatriate sportspeople in Australia
Expatriate soccer managers in Australia
Spanish expatriate sportspeople in India
Expatriate football managers in India
Expatriate football managers in Hong Kong
Spanish expatriate football managers
Indian Super League head coaches
Odisha FC head coaches
RCD Espanyol non-playing staff